is a Japanese chemist who specializes in supramolecular coordination chemistry.

Overviews 

He is a professor in the Department of Applied Chemistry at the University of Tokyo. He has published extensively on the multicomponent assembly of large coordination cages.  Compounds designed and prepared in his research group are variously described as three-dimensional synthetic receptors, coordination assemblies, molecular paneling, molecular flasks, crystalline sponges, and coordination capsules.

He shared the 2018 Wolf Prize in Chemistry with Omar Yaghi "for conceiving metal-directed assembly principles leading to large highly porous complexes".

Recognition

 1994 – Progress Award in Synthetic Organic Chemistry, Japan
 2000 – Division Award of Chemical Society of Japan (Organic Chemistry)
 2001 – Japan IBM Science Prize
 2009 – The Commendation for Science and Technology by the MEXT Prizes for Science and Technology
 2010 – The 7th Leo Esaki Prize
 2010 – Thomson Reuters Research Front Award
 2011 – 3M Lectureship Award (The University of British Columbia)
 2012 – Kharasch Lecturers (The University of Chicago)
 2013 – Arthur C. Cope Scholar Award
 2013 – The Chemical Society of Japan (CSJ) Award
 2013 – Merck-Karl Pfister Visiting Professorship (MIT Lectureship award)
 2014 – Medal with Purple Ribbon
 2014 – Fred Basolo Medal (Northwestern University)
 2018 – Wolf Prize in Chemistry
 2020 – Clarivate Citation Laureate

References

External links

FUJITA, Makoto | Research | Institute for Molecular Science

Living people
Inorganic chemists
Japanese chemists
1957 births